Dian Paramita Sastrowardoyo (born 16 March 1982) is an Indonesian actress and model of Javanese descent. She made her recognition lead role as Cinta in Indonesian 2001 film Ada Apa Dengan Cinta?, which won her five Best Actress awards.

Early life and education 
Dian Sastrowardoyo was born on 16 March 1982 in Jakarta, Indonesia, to Ariawan Sastrowardoyo (1955-1995), an artist, and Dewi Parwati Sastrowardoyo (née Setyorini), a university lecturer. Sastrowardoyo was born as a Christian and raised as a Roman Catholic. Her paternal grandfather, Dr. Sumarsono Sastrowardoyo (1922-2008), was a physician, surgeon, and book author. Her uncle, Dr. Aswin Wisaksono Sastrowardoyo (b. 1957), is a musician turned physician. She is also the grandniece of both Sunario (1902-1997), Indonesia's Minister of Foreign Affairs from 1953 to 1956; Dra. Sukanti Suryochondro (1915-2004), a former instructor in women's studies at the University of Indonesia; and Subagio Sastrowardoyo (1924–1995), a noted poet and literary critic. Her paternal great-grandfather, Sutejo Sastrowardoyo (1878–1967), traced the family's ancestry back to the 15th century Javanese. Sastrowardoyo's family name is derived from sastra (Sanskrit, "writings") and wardaya ("heart", hence both: "writings of the heart").

She attended junior high school at the SMP Vincentius Otista Jakarta and high school at the SMA Tarakanita 1. Then, she continued her higher studies at the University of Indonesia where she studied law briefly before moving to the Faculty of Literature, where she obtained her bachelor's degree in philosophy in July 2007. She did her post-graduate degree at the School of Economics at the same institution, where she studied Finance Management as her major and earned a Master's in Management degree. She graduated cum laude in August 2014.

Career
She began her modelling career in 1996 as the cover girl of Gadis, a popular teen magazine in Indonesia. She starred in the second main role as Daya in Pasir Berbisik, which was a critical success and won her many awards. She rose to prominence with her starring role as Cinta in the cult classic romance movie Ada Apa dengan Cinta?, which was a box office hit not only in Indonesia, but also in Malaysia a year later in January 2003. Since then she has established herself as one of Indonesia's most bankable actresses, starring in films such as Banyu Biru, Ungu Violet and Belahan Jiwa. as well as international films such as the Malaysian production Puteri Gunung Ledang.

Other television appearances include playing Raya in Dunia Tanpa Koma and a brief stint as the host of the television game show Kuis Super Milyarder 3 Milyar aired on ANTV, which is the spin-off second season in Indonesian version of Who Wants to Be a Millionaire?.

Sastrowardoyo is the goodwill ambassador for the MTV EXIT youth campaign, a multimedia initiative produced by MTV EXIT Foundation to raise awareness and increase prevention of human trafficking and modern slavery through live events, video content, and youth engagement. She even hosted a special programme for the campaign in 2012 titled Enslaved, produced for thirteen different countries across Asia.

At the age of 14, she won the teen beauty pageant Gadis Sampul. She achieved wide spread recognition for her role as Cinta in the 2002 romantic film Ada Apa Dengan Cinta?, for which she won the Citra Award for Best Actress. She reprised the role in the sequel 14 years later. She won the Best Actress award in the Deauville Asian Film Festival for her role in Pasir Berbisik in 2002. Sastrowardoyo is one of the most successful actresses in Indonesia. She has been the face model of L'Oréal Paris Indonesia since 2010. In 2016, she reprised her role as the titular character in Ada Apa Dengan Cinta? 2, the sequel to Ada Apa dengan Cinta? opposite actor Nicholas Saputra.

In 2016, Dian starred as Indonesia's national heroine in the biographical drama movie Kartini. In 2018, Dian starred in Aruna dan Lidahnya (Aruna and Her Palate), a film based on the Laksmi Pamuntjak written book novel of the same name.

In 2020, she starred in the comedy film Crazy Awesome Teachers and it released directly on Netflix.

Personal life
Dian Sastrowardoyo married businessman Maulana Indraguna Sutowo, the son of business tycoon Adiguna Sutowo, on 18 May 2010. The couple have two children: Shailendra Naryama Sastraguna Sutowo (born 17 July 2011) and Ishana Ariandra Nariratana Sutowo (born 7 June 2013).

Filmography

Films

Television

Endorsements
 L'Oréal
 LUX
 Samsung Corby
 NATUR-E
 Panasonic
 Mentari Indosat
 Sunsilk
 Torabika Creamy Latte
 Prenagen
 Vitalong C
 LINE

Music video appearances

 Xirus Indonesia – "Yang Terdalam" (2010)
 Glenn Fredly – "Hitam Putih" (2009)
 Keyla – "Tempat Berbeda" (2008)
 Peterpan – "Menghapus Jejakmu" (2007)
 T-Five – "Yang Terindah" (2002)
 Dewa – "Sayap-sayap Patah" (2001)
 Shelomita – "Langkah" (2000)
 Katon Bagaskara – "Cinta Selembut Awan" (2000)
 Sheila on 7 – "J.A.P" (1999)
 Sheila on 7 – "Anugerah Terindah" (1999)
 The Fly – "Air Mata Sunyi" (1999)
 KLA Project – "Gerimis" (1996)

 PADI – “ Menanti Sebuah Jawaban" (2005)
 DISKORIA – "Serenata Jiwa Lara" (2020)

Awards and nominations

Notes

External links

 

1982 births
Indonesian bloggers
Indonesian female models
Indonesian film actresses
Javanese people
Converts to Islam from Catholicism
Indonesian former Christians
Indonesian Muslims
Indonesian socialites
Actresses from Jakarta
Living people
Dian
Indonesian women bloggers